The 2020 NWSL Challenge Cup was a one-off tournament during the 2020 National Women's Soccer League season to mark the league's return to action from the COVID-19 pandemic.

NWSL teams were required to submit finalized rosters to participate in the 2020 NWSL Challenge Cup on June 21. Roster sizes were required to be a minimum of 22 players and maximum of 28 players (24 senior players + 4 supplemental players) and contain at least three goalkeepers. Only players listed on that final roster will be permitted to participate in the tournament. Furthermore, teams could sign a maximum of 4 players they had the rights to but were not yet under contract to short-term contracts lasting the duration of the tournament. Short-term loans from teams outside the NWSL were also permissible.

Squads were announced on June 23, 2020. 22 of the 32 federation players were included in the squads.

The age listed is as of June 27, 2020, the first day of the tournament. Flags indicate national team as defined under FIFA eligibility rules. Players may hold more than one non-FIFA nationality.

Chicago Red Stars 

The final 28-player roster was announced on June 23, 2020.

Head coach:  Rory Dames

Houston Dash 

The final 24-player roster was announced on June 23, 2020.

Head coach:  James Clarkson

North Carolina Courage 

The final 25-player roster was announced on June 23, 2020.

Head coach:  Paul Riley

OL Reign 

The final 28-player roster was announced on June 23, 2020.

Head coach:  Farid Benstiti

Portland Thorns FC 

The final 25-player roster was announced on June 23, 2020.

Head coach:  Mark Parsons

Sky Blue FC 

The final 26-player roster was announced on June 23, 2020.

Head coach:  Freya Coombe

Utah Royals FC 

The final 28-player roster was announced on June 23, 2020.

Head coach:  Craig Harrington

Washington Spirit 

The final 26-player roster was announced on June 23, 2020.

Head coach:  Richie Burke

References

External links 

 

2020 National Women's Soccer League season